Miss Christina is a 2013 Romanian horror film directed by Alexandru Maftei. The script is based on the 1936 novella Miss Christina by Mircea Eliade. The film had 24,389 admissions in Romania, which made it the third most successful domestic film in 2013.

Cast
 Ioana Anastasia Anton as Sanda
 Maia Morgenstern as Mrs. Moscu
 Tudor Istodor as Egor Pașchievici, a painter
 Toma Cuzin

See also
 Miss Christina (1992 film), an earlier adaptation of the same novella

References

External links

FNE at TIFF 2013: Miss Christina

2013 films
2010s Romanian-language films
Romanian horror films
Films based on works by Mircea Eliade
Films directed by Alexandru Maftei
Films shot in Romania
Films about fictional painters
Films based on Romanian novels
Ghost films
Haunted house films
2013 horror films